The list of Banaras University people includes notable graduates, professors and administrators affiliated with Banaras Hindu University in Varanasi. For a list of Vice-Chancellors, see List of Vice-Chancellors of Banaras Hindu University.

Nobel laureates
 C. V. Raman, the Nobel Prize winner in Physics in 1930 and Bharat Ratna laureate in 1954 (permanent visiting professor at BHU)

Heads of state and government
 A.P.J. Abdul Kalam, 11th President of India, 2002–2007;Bharat Ratna laureate in 1997 (visiting professor, taught technology at BHU)
 Bishweshwar Prasad Koirala (B.A. 1934), former Prime Minister of Nepal
 Sarvepalli Radhakrishnan, first Vice President of India, 1952–1962; second President of India, 1962–1967; Bharat Ratna laureate in 1954 (the Vice Chancellor of BHU from 17 September 1939 to 16 January 1948)
 Krishan Kant (M.Sc.), former Vice President of India

Notable alumni

Arts, humanities and social sciences

|-
|Adya Prasad Pandey
|
|BSc (Zoology, Botany ),M.A.,MBA ,Ph.D.
|Economist , Former Vice Chancellor ; Recipient of the BHU Gold Medal, Vice Chancellor
|
|}

 Bettina Bäumer, Austrian-born Indian scholar and academic
|-
|Veena Pandey
|
|B.A.,M.A. ,Ph.D. in Hindi 
|Politician, Former Member of Legislative Council ;  Politician
|
|}
 Mannu Bhandari (M.A. 1953), writer 
 Radha Burnier (B.A., M.A), theosophist
 Kamalesh Chandra Chakrabarty (M.Sc., Ph.D.), Deputy Governor, Reserve Bank of India (2009-2014)
Ram Charan, business consultant
 Shiba Prasad Chatterjee, geographer
 Koenraad Elst, Belgian scholar
 Amara Ranatunga, Sri Lankan songstress
 Madhav Sadashiv Golwalkar (B.Sc. 1926, M.Sc. 1928), second Sarsanghchalak (Supreme Chief) of the Rashtriya Swayamsevak Sangh
 K. N. Govindacharya (M.Sc. 1962), environmentalist, social activist
 Shivamurthy Shivacharya Mahaswamiji (Ph.D.), social activist, educationist
 Vina Mazumdar, feminist, academic, pioneer of women's studies
 Ananda Shankar, Hindustani classical musician
 Raimon Panikkar, Spanish theologian
 Robert M. Pirsig, American philosopher
 Paul William Roberts (studied Sanskrit), writer
 Sameer Anjaan (M.Com.), lyricist
 Ritwik Sanyal (M.A., Ph.D. 1980), Hindustani classical musician, Dhrupad vocalist
 Sarveshwar Dayal Saxena, poet
 Kamala Shankar (M.Sc., Ph.D.), Hindustani classical musician
 Vibhuti Narayan Singh (M.A.), last Maharaja of Benares; social activist; Chancellor of BHU
 Moti BA (B.A.), Bhojpuri Language Poet and Author
 Harivash Narayan Singh, MA Economics 1976, Diploma Journalism 1977

Social Sciences

Literature 
Sitaram Chaturvedi (B.A., M.A., Ph.D.), playwright, academic
Janki Ballabh Shastri, Indian Hindi poet, writer and critic, Padma Shri (2010)

Politicians 
Ved Prakash Goyal, politician
 Rajesh Kumar Mishra, politician
 Yadunandan Sharma (B.A. 1929), Indian independence activist, farmers' rights activist
 Shyama Charan Shukla, Chief Minister of Madhya Pradesh
 Veena Pandey, (B.A., M.A., B.Ed., LLB, Ph.D.), Former M.L.C., National Executive Member, B.J.P. Former Vice President Student Union B.H.U.

Science and technology

 Prem Saran Satsangi Sahab, Leader of Radhasoami Faith, Dayalbagh. System Scientist and Physicist. (Ex Dean IIT Delhi, EX-Vice chancellor, Dayalbagh Educational Institute) 
 Ashok Agarwal (B.Sc. 1975, M.Sc. 1977, Ph.D. 1983), pioneer in reproductive biology
 Girish Saran Agarwal (M.Sc.), physicist specialising in quantum optics; Regents Professor in the Department of Physics of Oklahoma State University; winner of the Shanti Swarup Bhatnagar Prize (Physics) in 1982; elected Fellow of the Royal Society in 2008
 Pulickel Ajayan (B.Tech. 1985), pioneer in nanotechnology
 Nikesh Arora (B.Tech. 1989), senior vice president and chief business officer at Google
 Meenakshi Banerjee, scientist
 Bir Bhanu, (B.Tech. 1972), Electronics Engineering, Bourns Presidential Chair in Engineering and Distinguished Professor of Electrical and Computer Engineering University of California, Riverside, California 
 Alok Bhattacharya, Parasitologist and Shanti Swarup Bhatnagar laureate
 Achal Das Bohra (B.Sc. 1941), government administrator, engineer
 S. Ganesh (PhD 1996), molecular geneticist, N-Bios laureate 
 Vinod Kumar Gaur, seismologist, Shanti Swarup Bhatnagar laureate
 Kota Harinarayana (B.Tech. 1965), scientist, academic
 Aldas Janaiah (Ph.D. 1995), agricultural scientist
 Arvind Mohan Kayastha (B.Sc. 1979, M.Sc. 1982, Ph.D. 1988), scientist, academic
 Akhlesh Lakhtakia (B.Tech. 1979, D.Sc. 2006), pioneered sculptured thin films
 Subhash Chandra Lakhotia, cytogeneticist, Shanti Swarup Bhatnagar laureate
 Devendra Lal, geophysicist; winner of the Shanti Swarup Bhatnagar Prize (Physics) in 1967; elected Fellow of the Royal Society in 1979
 Shrikant Lele, metallurgical engineer, Shanti Swarup Bhatnagar laureate
 Anand Mohan (B.Sc. 1976, Ph.D. 1983), geologist
 Basanti Dulal Nagchaudhuri (B.Sc. 1936), physicist
 Nishtala Appala Narasimham (M.Sc. 1945, Ph.D. 1952), physicist
 Jayant Vishnu Narlikar (B.Sc. 1957), theoretical physicist, Padma Vibhushan (1965)
 Paramasivam Natarajan, photochemist, Shanti Swarup Bhatnagar laureate
 Sri Niwas, geophysicist, Shanti Swarup Bhatnagar laureate
 Ganesh Prasad Pandey, organic chemist, Shanti Swarup Bhatnagar laureate
 Virendra Nath Pandey, Molecular virologist, Shanti Swarup Bhatnagar laureate
 T. V. Ramakrishnan (B.Sc. 1959, M.Sc. 1961), theoretical physicist; winner of the Shanti Swarup Bhatnagar Prize (Physics) in 1982; elected Fellow of the Royal Society in 2000
 Shyam Sundar Rai, seismologist, Shanti Swarup Bhatnagar laureate
 Madisetti Anant Ramlu, founder and first Head of the Department of Mining Engineering at the Indian Institute of Technology (IIT) 
 Ayyagari Sambasiva Rao, founder of ECIL
 C. N. R. Rao (M.Sc. 1953), chemist; scientific advisor to the Prime Minister of India; Bharat Ratna laureate in 2014
 Ram Harsh Singh, Padmashri awardee 2016, ABMS 1961(BHU), MD(Hons), Ph.D. 1969 (BHU), D.Litt. FNA IM, Life-time Distinguished Professor, Faculty of Ayurveda BHU, First Vice Chancellor, Rajasthan Ayurved University, Jodhpur (2003-2006). 
 Narla Tata Rao, former chairman of the Andhra Pradesh State Electricity Board
 Palle Rama Rao (Ph.D.), metallurgist and Padma Vibhushan awardee
 Patcha Ramachandra Rao (M.Sc. 1965, Ph.D. 1968), metallurgist, Shanti Swarup Bhatnagar laureate, Vice Chancellor of BHU
 Udipi Ramachandra Rao (M.Sc. 1952), space scientist, Chairman of ISRO
 N. A. Ramaiah physical chemist, Shanti Swarup Bhatnagar laureate
 Gangadhar J. Sanjayan, bioorganic chemist, Shanti Swarup Bhatnagar laureate
 Mushi Santappa, polymer chemist, Shanti Swarup Bhatnagar laureate
 Debi Prasad Sarkar, Immunologist, Shanti Swarup Bhatnagar laureate
 Jagdish Shukla (B.Sc. 1962, M.Sc. 1964, Ph.D. 1971), meteorologist
 Lalji Singh, molecular biologist, Vice Chancellor of BHU
 Nagendra Kumar Singh (B.Sc. 1978, M.Sc. 1980), agricultural scientist; pioneer in mapping plant genomes
 Rishi Narain Singh, geophysicist, Shanti Swarup Bhatnagar laureate
 Manick Sorcar (B.Tech.), artist, engineer, entrepreneur
 Brahm Shanker Srivastava, microbiologist, Shanti Swarup Bhatnagar laureate
 Onkar Nath Srivastava (MSc 1961 and PhD 1966), material physicist and a recipient of Padma Shri and Shanti Swarup Bhatnagar Prize
 M. J. Thirumalachar, Shanti Swarup Bhatnagar laureate
 Satish K. Tripathi (B.Sc., M.Sc.), President of University at Buffalo, The State University of New York
 Prahalad Chunnilal Vaidya, physicist and mathematician; proponent of Vaidya Metric for gravitational fields; Vice Chancellor of Gujarat University
A. N. Rai ex vc NEHU
 Sandeep Verma, bioorganic chemist, Shanti Swarup Bhatnagar laureate
 Kameshwar C. Wali (M.Sc.), research physicist and science writer
 Saket Kushwaha (B.Sc. 1983, M.Sc. 1986, Ph.D. 1992), agricultural economist, VC Rajiv Gandhi University
Jay Chaudhry (B.Tech. 1980) Founder & CEO, Zscaler

Sports

Notable faculty

Arts, humanities and social sciences
 Adya Prasad Pandey, Professor in Economics and Former Head Department of Economics, Vice Chancellor Manipur University
 Anant Sadashiv Altekar, Manindra Chandra Nandi Chair of Ancient History & Culture; led archaeological excavation of Mauryan era structures
 C. V. Chandrasekhar, Professor of Performing Arts; Bharata Natyam dancer; Sangeet Natak Akademi Award winner; Kalidas Samman and Padma Bhushan awardee
 A.K. Chatterjee, Professor of philosophy, Indian philosopher and Buddhist scholar
Sitaram Chaturvedi, Professor of Literature, playwright
 Amiya Kumar Dasgupta, Professor of Economics (1947–1958); pioneer of economics in Independent India
 Girija Devi, Professor of Performing Arts; Hindustani classical vocalist
 Julius Getman, Visiting Professor of Law
 Chandradhar Sharma Guleri, former Manindra Chandra Nandi Chair in Ancient History and Religion
 Latika Katt, Professor of Visual Arts; sculptor
 Sucheta Kripalani, Professor of Constitutional History
 Dalsukh Dahyabhai Malvania, Jain scholar, writer and Padma Bhushan awardee
 Lalmani Misra, Professor of Music; Hindustani classical musician
 Ram Shankar Misra, Professor of Comparative Religion
 Awadh Kishore Narain, Professor of History (1947–1960); Manindra Chandra Nandi Chair of Ancient History & Culture (1960–1971)
 B.C. Nirmal, Professor of Law
 N. Rajam, Professor of Performing Arts
 S. R. Ranganathan, Professor of Library Science (1945–1947); inventor of colon classification and five laws of library science
 Ritwik Sanyal, Professor of Performing Arts; Hindustani classical musician
 Ram Chandra Shukla, Professor of Visual Arts; painter
 Ramchandra Shukla, Professor of Literature
 Gurbachan Singh Talib, Professor of Sikh Studies
 Omkarnath Thakur, Professor of Performing Arts; Hindustani classical musician
 Koushal Kishor Mishra, Professor of Political Sciences, and Dean, Faculty of Social Sciences
 Alok Kumar Rai, Professor of Management Studies

Science and technology
  Prem Saran Satsangi Sahab, Leader of Radhasoami Faith, Dayalbagh. System Scientist and Physicist. (Ex Dean IIT Delhi, EX-Vice chancellor, Dayalbagh Educational Institute) 
 Sir Shanti Swaroop Bhatnagar, Professor of Chemistry (1921–1924); co-inventor of Bhatnagar-Mathur Magnetic Interference Balance; founding chairman of Council of Scientific and Industrial Research
 Patcha Ramachandra Rao, former Vice Chancellor and Professor of Metallurgy and Material Science
 Prafulla Kumar Jena, former Professor of Metallurgical Engineering
 Madhu Sudan Kanungo, Professor of Biology (1962–2011); pioneer of gerontology; Padma Shri awardee
 Arvind Mohan Kayastha, Professor of Biotechnology
 Shrikant Lele, metallurgical engineer, Shanti Swarup Bhatnagar laureate
 Veer Bhadra Mishra, former Professor of Civil Engineering; environmentalist; founder of Swatcha Ganga Campaign
 Ganesh Prasad, Professor of Mathematics (1917–1923); mathematician
 Palle Rama Rao, Professor of Metallurgy (1962–1982); scientist; Padma Shri, Padma Bhushan and Padma Vibhushan awardee
 Birbal Sahni, Professor of Botany (1920); authority on plant fossils of Gondwana and Jurassic age
 Ram Harsh Singh Padmashri awardee 2016, ABMS 1961(BHU), MD(Hons), Ph.D. 1969 (BHU), D.Litt. FNA IM, Life-time Distinguished Professor, Faculty of Ayurveda BHU, First Vice Chancellor, Rajasthan Ayurved University, Jodhpur (2003-2006).
 Onkar Nath Srivastava Professor of the department of physics, material physicist and a recipient of Padma Shri and Shanti Swarup Bhatnagar Prize
 Birendra Bijoy Biswas, lecturer (1952–54); department of botany, recipient of Shanti Swarup Bhatnagar Prize
 Jamuna Sharan Singh, ecologist, Shanti Swarup Bhatnagar Prize recipient
 Kamanio Chattopadhyay, materials engineer, Shanti Swarup Bhatnagar Prize recipient
 Sunit Kumar Singh, molecular biologist, Fellow of Indian Academy of Neuroscience (FIANS)

References

 
People by university or college in Uttar Pradesh
Banaras Hindu University
Uttar Pradesh education-related lists